David Halliday may refer to:

 Dave Halliday, Scottish professional footballer
 David Halliday (physicist), American physicist and textbook author
 David Halliday (software engineer), former CEO of Silvaco